The 2006-07 AEL Limassol BC season was the team's 40th season. Athlitiki Enosi Lemesou, often abbreviated as AEL, is a Cypriot professional basketball club based in Limassol.

Roster 

Basketball teams in Cyprus